Mendut is a ninth-century Buddhist temple, located in Mendut village, Mungkid sub-district, Magelang Regency, Central Java, Indonesia. The temple is located about three kilometres east from Borobudur. Mendut, Borobudur and Pawon, all of which are Buddhist temples, are located in one straight line. There is a mutual religious relationship between the three temples, although the exact ritual process is unknown.

History 

Built around early ninth century AD, Mendut is the oldest of the three temples including Pawon and Borobudur. The Karangtengah inscription, the temple was built and finished during the reign of King Indra of Sailendra dynasty. The inscription dated 824 AD mentioned that King Indra of Sailendra has built a sacred building named Venuvana which means "bamboo forest". Dutch archaeologist JG de Casparis has connected the temple mentioned in Karangtengah inscription with Mendut temple.

In 1836 it was discovered as a ruins covered with bushes. The restoration of this temple was started in 1897 and was finished in 1925. Some archaeologists who had conducted research on this temple were JG de Casparis, and Arisatya Yogaswara.

Architecture 

The plan of temple's base is square, and measures 13.7 metre on each side, with the base level 3.7 metre above the ground . The 26.4 metre tall temple is facing northwest. The stairs projecting from the northwest side square elevated base is adorned with Makara statue on each sides, the side of the stairwall carved with bas-relief of Jataka fable narrating the animal story of Buddhist teaching. The square terrace surrounding the body of the temple was meant for pradakshina or circumambulating ritual, walking clockwise around the temple. The outer walls is adorned with bas-reliefs of Boddhisattvas (Buddhist divinities), such as Avalokitesvara, Maitreya, Cunda, Ksitigarbha, Samantabhadra, Mahakarunika Avalokitesvara, Vajrapani, Manjusri, Akasagarbha, and Boddhisattvadevi Prajnaparamita among other buddhist figures. Originally the temple had two chambers, a small chamber in the front, and the large main chamber in the center. The roof and some parts of the front chamber walls are missing. The uppermost part of the roof is missing, it supposed to have a stupa pinnacle with size and style probably just like the one in Sojiwan temple. The inner wall of front chamber is adorned with bas-relief of Hariti surrounds by children, Atavaka on the other side, Kalpataru, also groups of devatas divinities flying in heaven.

The main room has three carved large stone statues.  The 3 metres tall statue of Dhyani Buddha Vairocana was meant to liberate the devotees from the bodily karma, at the left is statue of Boddhisatva Avalokitesvara to liberate from the karma of speech, at the right is Boddhisatva Vajrapani to liberate from karma of thought.

Rituals

 
During full moon in May or June, Buddhists in Indonesia observe the annual Vesak ritual by walking from Mendut through Pawon to Borobudur. The ritual takes the form of a mass Buddhist prayer and pradakshina (circumambulation) around the temple.

Followers of traditional Kejawen (Javanese mysticism) or Buddhists, came to worship in the Mendut temple and it is believed to be able to fulfill wishes, such as deliverance from sickness. Childless couples, for example, pray at the bas-relief of Hariti for a child, since in traditional Javanese beliefs, Hariti is a symbol of fertility, patroness of motherhood and protector of children.

See also 

 Buddhism in Indonesia
 Candi of Indonesia
 Indonesian Esoteric Buddhism
 Borobudur
 Banyunibo
 Ngawen
 Pawon

References

External links 
 Map of Mendut Temple from wikimapia

9th-century Buddhist temples
Archaeological sites in Indonesia
Buddhist temples in Indonesia
Borobudur
Shailendra dynasty
Cultural Properties of Indonesia in Central Java
Religious buildings and structures in Central Java